Mukherjee Dar Bou [lit. Mr.Mukherjee's wife] (2019) is an Indian Bengali film directed by Pritha Chakraborty.  This was Chakraborty's debut film as a director. The film tells a story of a Bengali family, the relationship between a mother-in-law and her daughter-in-law. The music of the film was composed was Indraadip Dasgupta.

Synopsis  
Mukherjee Dar Bou is a story based on a modern dysfunctional family revolving around the complex and intricate yet caring relationship of a mother-in-law and her daughter-in-law. The story revolves around a Bengali homemaker whose name is not known until the end of the film, and who is mostly referred to as “Mukherjee Dar Bou”. Mukherjee Dar Bou (Aditi) is married for more than ten years and has a daughter, who is six years old. Aditi's married life is usual but it takes a turn when her father-in-law passes away and her mother-in-law finds it difficult to cope with the changed dynamics within the family set-up. It reaches a breaking point when one day the mother-in-law gets angry and throws the rolling pin and the kid, Icche Puron, comes in between and gets hurt. Aditi's friend suggests she take her mother-in-law to a psychologist. Though apprehensive, she takes her mother-in-law to the psychologist by lying about the reality. In this film, various shades of women and their crises have been shown and this movie is about the path of overcoming their different individual crises.

Cast 
 Anusuya Majumdar as Shova Rani Mukherjee
 Koneenica Banerjee as Aditi Mukherjee
 Rituparna Sengupta as Aratrika Bhattacharya
 Aparajita Auddy  as Putul Das
 Badshah Moitra as Ajitesh
 Biswanath Basu as Shashwata Mukherjee
 Shankar Chakraborty as Putul's Husband
 Richa Sharma as Rahi
 Adolina as Icche Puron Mukherjee

Release and reception 
The film was released on 8 March 2019 on International Women's Day. Millennium Post, in their review, wrote: "The beauty of the film lies not in dwelling on these scars, but in showing a way how even such stubborn scars can be wiped off with a pinch of understanding and love. It's about repairing human relationships slowly."

Themes 
Released on International Woman's day, the central theme of the movie is Feminism. It refers to various cultural phrases and ideas, typically identified as patriarchal. The film also touches upon how these cultural saying and habits are passed through generations of women, without careful examination or prejudice. It is considered one of the landmark movies of the Bengali film industry as it's the first-ever Bengali film to celebrate the day by coming up with a story by the women, having female leads.
Few other important themes dealt with in the film are:

1. It's all about friendship - Ever wondered what spell friendship can cast? Good and healthy relationships are built on the foundation of friendship. A relationship, apparently coated with hatred, will take a turn when two people hold each other's hands for good. This film, once again, will make you celebrate friendship like never before.
 
2. Not a clichéd saas-bahu saga - Bored of those daily soaps talking about kitchen politics? If yes, then this film is quite the right choice for you! Can you believe that there is no villain here and no one is wracking their brains, plotting murder? Here the protagonists love each other, help each other and pave the way for a better future.
 
3. Seek help to improve mental health - At last, they say it aloud! Mukherjee Dar Bou is a film that talks about women's mental health and the growing importance of seeking help from a psychologist when needed. Probably this is one of the first few films in Bengal that addresses the mental health issue.
 
4. Slice-of-life movie - Mukherjee Dar Bou is a slice-of-life movie to which you can relate very easily. The problems are known to all of us, but this film talks about how these problems can be solved easily when 'I' is pushed aside and 'we' come to the fore.
 
5. Slap on patriarchy - There's a raging debate about equal rights, equal pay and everything in between. But what about those who don't get paid for the efforts they put in at home? Aren’t they working enough? What about their rights? Who will speak up for them? Mukherjee Dar Bou does exactly that. For the first time, a Bengali film talks about the rights of those women who remain within the territory of home. It's a film for those who are refugees in their own homes and for whom, home is either their father's place or that of their husband's.

Sound Track

Achievements  
The film bagged the Critics’ Choice film award for Gender Sensitivity. 
The Times of India gave a four star rating to the film. Times of India in their review wrote: “It’s a story of emancipation — from the invisible shackles that tie most women to an identity that’s not really their own, but of the man in their lives.”  
https://timesofindia.indiatimes.com/entertainment/bengali/movie-reviews/mukherjee-dar-bou/movie-review/68332602.cms
https://planetbollywood.com/wp/news/windows-productions-film-best-critics-choice-award/

References

External links 
 

Films set in Kolkata
Bengali-language Indian films
2010s Bengali-language films
Films scored by Rabindranath Tagore
Films scored by Indradeep Dasgupta